Quercus griffithii, called paisang, is a species of oak native to the eastern Himalayas, Tibet, south-central and southeast China, Assam, Myanmar, Thailand, Laos, and Vietnam. It is in the subgenus Quercus, section Quercus. Some authorities feel that it could be a synonym of Quercus aliena var. acutiserrata. It is a locally important fuelwood and fodder species.

References

griffithii
Plants described in 1864